Austin Edward Hill (born April 21, 1994) is an American professional stock car racing driver and former team owner. He competes full-time in the NASCAR Xfinity Series, driving the No. 21 Chevrolet Camaro for Richard Childress Racing and part-time in the NASCAR Cup Series, driving the No. 62 Chevrolet Camaro ZL1 for Beard Motorsports. Hill previously owned NASCAR Craftsman Truck Series and ARCA Menards Series team Austin Hill Racing from 2013 to 2017.

Racing career
Starting racing when he was six, Hill climbed the ladder racing various disciplines such as Legend cars and Bandolero racing.

K&N Pro Series East
After driving sporadically in 2012, Hill captured a win in 2013 despite only running five races that season. His first full season in the series (2014) started slow but ended well, winning the final two races to finish fifth in the points. Hill continued his career in the K&N Pro Series East with a strong 2015 season. Driving for a family-owned team, he captured a pole, two wins, and failed to finish only once in a season that left him third in points. After switching his focus to the Camping World Truck Series in 2016, he only ran one race in the series, finishing ninth.

ARCA Menards Series
Hill debuted in the ARCA Menards Series at the 2015 season opener, avoiding wrecks to finish just outside the top ten at Daytona International Speedway. 

Hill returned to the ARCA Menards Series in 2021. During his Truck Series off weekend, he drove in the race at Mid-Ohio Sports Car Course in preparation for the Truck Series road course races later in the season. He drove for his Truck Series team, Hattori Racing Enterprises, in their No. 1 car.

Camping World Truck Series

Hill debuted in 2014 with RBR Enterprises, with finishes of 26th at Martinsville Speedway and 20th at Homestead-Miami Speedway during that season. Hill landed a part-time ride with Empire Racing in the 2014 season, crashing at Daytona International Speedway and recording a best finish of 16th (at Dover International Speedway) in three other starts that year. For the start of 2016, Hill announced that he would again run the Daytona race with Empire, and then switching to his family-owned Austin Hill Racing for a part-time schedule. He failed to qualify for Daytona and four other races early in the season and had a best finish of 15th through the twelfth race of the year. Picking up his schedule after that and running some races in an entry bought out from Young's Motorsports, Hill started to experience more consistent success, leading up to his first top-ten, a tenth place at Martinsville Speedway. Hill formally became a part of the Young's team in 2018, running a full season for the team and grabbing a top-five finish at Texas Motor Speedway. Hill later said that when he joined the team, he figured it would be a long-term arrangement, not just a year.

On January 8, 2019, it was announced that Hill joined Hattori Racing Enterprises' No. 16 Toyota Tundra full-time for the upcoming season. The arrangement was made after crew chief Scott Zipadelli reached out to Hill after previous driver Brett Moffitt departed the team. Hill scored his record first win at the season-opening Daytona race. At Pocono in July, Hill set a new track record for the Truck Series on his way to the pole. He won the regular-season finale race at Michigan for his second career win, and won again at the playoff race at Las Vegas, advancing his team to the Round of 6. Hill failed to advance to the Championship 4, but won the finale at Homestead, finishing 5th in final points.

On November 5, 2019, HRE announced that Hill would remain in the No. 16 for the 2020 Truck Series season. He qualified for the playoffs and advanced to the Round of 8 with a win at Las Vegas. An Ilmor engine failure at Martinsville ended the team's playoffs in the second round.

On October 30, 2020, Hill was confirmed for a third full season with HRE.

On February 11, 2022, it was announced that he would drive the No. 7 truck for Spire Motorsports at Daytona.

Xfinity Series
On June 16, 2019, it was announced that Hill would make his NASCAR Xfinity Series debut at the Circle K Firecracker 250 at Daytona for Hattori Racing Enterprises, driving the No. 61 Toyota Supra. However, he missed the race after his car suffered drive line issues that prevented him from setting a qualifying time. Later debuting at Indianapolis Motor Speedway, Hill used the high groove to his advantage on his way to scoring a ninth-place finish in his series debut.

Hill and HRE continued their part-time Xfinity schedule in 2020 starting with the season opener at Daytona. On October 30, Hill was confirmed for a 2021 part-time return to the No. 61 machine.

On October 29, 2021, Hill was announced as a full-time driver for Richard Childress Racing. He scored his first career win at Daytona after passing A. J. Allmendinger on the final lap of the race. The end of the race was marred by a vicious last lap wreck that sent Myatt Snider into the backstretch catchfence. Hill led the most laps and scored his second career Xfinity win at his home track of Atlanta in July. Hill was eliminated from the Xfinity Playoffs following the Round of 8 after finishing ninth at Martinsville as a result of a collision with Snider. Following the race, Hill punched Snider in the face on pit road. At the end of the season, he finished sixth in the points standings and won the 2022 NASCAR Xfinity Series Rookie of the Year honors.

Hill began the 2023 season by winning his second straight season opener at Daytona. He also scored wins at Las Vegas and Atlanta.

Cup Series
On August 2, 2022, RCR announced that Hill would make his Cup Series debut in the No. 33 at Michigan.

Hill attempted to make the 2023 Daytona 500 with the Beard Motorsports No. 62, but he failed to make the field after a late crash resulted in an 18th place finish in Duel 2 of the 2023 Bluegreen Vacations Duels.

Personal life
Hill and his wife have three children: two daughters and a son.

Motorsports career results

NASCAR
(key) (Bold – Pole position awarded by qualifying time. Italics – Pole position earned by points standings or practice time. * – Most laps led.)

Cup Series

Daytona 500

Xfinity Series

Camping World Truck Series

 Season still in progress
 Ineligible for series points

K&N Pro Series East

K&N Pro Series West

ARCA Menards Series
(key) (Bold – Pole position awarded by qualifying time. Italics – Pole position earned by points standings or practice time. * – Most laps led.)

References

External links
 
 

1994 births
Living people
NASCAR drivers
ARCA Menards Series drivers
Racing drivers from Georgia (U.S. state)
People from Douglas County, Georgia
Richard Childress Racing drivers
NASCAR Truck Series regular season champions